Tívoli is a 1974 Mexican comedy-drama film directed by Alberto Isaac and starring Alfonso Arau, Pancho Córdova, Lyn May and Carmen Salinas. Loosely based on the true story of the last days of the Tívoli, an infamous variety theatre which had its heyday in the 1940s and early 1950s in Mexico City, the film, as its opening text claims, rather than give an historical account, aspires to evocate, in a nostalgic and humorous way, the atmosphere of the lively nightlife of that period, "which has disappeared forever." Interweaved with burlesque performances with colorful costumes and sets, seductive stripteases and comedic variety acts, the film's main plot tells how a plan to tear down the theater by politicians, city officials, and property developers is met with resistance by the entertainers.

Cast
 Alfonso Arau as Tiliches  
 Pancho Córdova as Jesús Quijano "Quijanito" 
 Lyn May as Eva Candela  
 Carmen Salinas as Chapas  
 Mario García "Harapos" as himself  
 Héctor Ortega as lawyer Félix Pantoja "Cacomixtle"
 Dorotea Guerra as Lilí
 Ernesto Gómez Cruz as engineer Reginaldo T.  
 Dámaso Pérez Prado as himself
 The Dolly Sisters as themselves
 Don Facundo as himself  
 José Wilhelmy "Willy" as himself
 Gina Morett as Mimí Manila  
 Paco Müller as Bulmaro  
 Consuelo Quezada as dwarf
 Margarito Alfaro as dwarf
 Zuzy D'Tornell as Naná  
 Alfredo Soto as devil  
 Germán Funes as gay man  
 José Luis Aguirre "Trotsky" as Waikiki nightclub emcee  
 Juan José Martínez Casado as Pueyo  
 Roberto Corell as Tarragón  
 Gerardo Zepeda as Criaturón  
 Dai Won Moon as Chi  
 Xavier Fuentes as stage director  
 Mario Zebadúa "Colocho" as blind man  
 Carolina Barret as Ms. Quijano  
 Alberto Mariscal as city's mayor
 Paloma Zozaya as showgirl  
 Armando Pascual as Lupe 
 Sara Guasch as dress shop owner  
 Manuel Alvarado as orchestra leader  
 Federico González as traffic cop
 Juan Garza as bodyguard
 Elsa Benn
 "Chino" Ibarra as trumpeter
 Cristal
 Paco Sañudo as performer
 Regino Herrera as man in waiting room
 Nathanael León as Sobera  
 Alfredo Gutiérrez as man with Reginaldo
 Claudio Isaac as TV cameraman
 León Michel as TV director
 Miguel Ángel Ferriz nieto
 Inés Murillo as doña Engracia  
 Ramiro Orci as police agent  
 Armando Duarte
 Miguel Inclán hijo
 Carlos Gómez 
 Lupita Peruyero
 Héctor Kiev
 Margarita Narváez "Fufurufa"
 Jesús Duarte
 Rubén Calderón

References

Bibliography 
 Mora, Carl J. (University of California Press, 1982). Mexican Cinema: Reflections of a Society, 1896-2004. Third ed., 2005. McFarland & Company. .

External links 
 

1974 films
1974 comedy-drama films
Mexican comedy-drama films
1970s Spanish-language films
Films directed by Alberto Isaac
Films set in Mexico City
Films set in the 1950s
1970s Mexican films